The 7th Presidium of the Workers' Party of Korea (WPK)(제 7차 조선로동당 상임위원회), officially the Presidium of the Political Bureau of the 7th Congress of the Workers' Party of Korea, was elected by the 1st Plenary Session of the 7th Central Committee on 10 May 2016.

Members

References

Citations

Bibliography
Books:
 
 
  

Dissertations:
 

7th Presidium of the Workers' Party of Korea
2016 establishments in North Korea
2021 disestablishments in North Korea